Giorgi Melikidze (born 24 May 1996) is a Georgian rugby union player. His position is prop, and he currently plays for Stade Français in the Top 14 and the Georgia national team.

References

1996 births
Living people
Rugby union hookers
Rugby union players from Georgia (country)
Stade Français players
Georgia international rugby union players